A real-name system is a system in which users can register an account on a blog, website or bulletin board system using their legal name.

Users are required to provide identification credentials and their legal name. A public pseudonym can also be used, but the person's identity is available to legal authorities for use in criminal investigations. Real-name systems are employed on websites such as Facebook and Quora.

History 
Real name systems originated from government regulations. Governments provided citizens with official surnames. This allowed them to track property ownership and inheritance, collect taxes, maintain court records, perform police work, conscript soldiers and control epidemics.

Germany
For privacy reasons, Germany’s 1997 § 13 VI Telemediengesetz (nowadays: § 19 II TTDSG) does not allow forcing people to use real-names if a real-name is not necessary for an internet service. On 27th of January, 2022, the highest court in civil matters, the Bundesgerichtshof, decided that Facebook’s ban of pseudonyms is illegal for users who registered before GDPR was implemented in May 2018.

Japan
On February 2023, the proposal to introduce internet real-name system which similar to China one's was announced by Digital Minister Taro Kono and he said: "If we first use the phone number card for authentication when creating accounts for various services such as social networking services, we can ensure that age restrictions are strictly observed, so I think the phone number card will be useful in this area as well. Digital Minister Kono stated that "some unsolicited videos are clearly criminal acts, and in such cases, people must be made aware of the fact that they are crimes", and that "putting videos on the Internet for fun will affect people's lives for a long time". He also stated that it is necessary to cooperate with the Ministry of Education, Culture, Sports, Science and Technology (MEXT) and others to provide guidance in the field of education in order to improve internet literacy.

South Korea
South Korea was the first country to put an internet real-name system into practice. Since 2009, 35 Korean websites have implemented a name registration system in compliance with South Korea's amended Information and Communications Network Act. This act was enforced after the suicide of Choi Jin-sil, which was believed to have been related to malicious bulletin board comments about her. Real name systems aim to minimize the amount of negative information published on the Internet and encourage netizens to be responsible for their online behavior.

South Koreans have been familiar with offline real-name systems since the mid-1990s, when legislation was introduced that required a real name to be used for property and financial transactions. In August 2011 hackers accessed the databases for the real-name system, obtaining the registration numbers of 35 million people.

On 23 August 2012, the Constitutional Court of Korea ruled unanimously that the real-name requirements imposed on portal service providers were unconstitutional, claiming that this violates freedom of speech in cyberspace. As a result, the so-called "Choi Jin-sil Law" was discarded.

The Constitutional Court said:
The system does not seem to have been beneficial to the public. Despite the enforcement of the system, the number of illegal or malicious postings online has not decreased. Instead, users moved to foreign Websites and the system became discriminatory against domestic operators. It also prevented foreigners who didn’t have a resident registration number here from expressing their opinions online.

China

The Chinese government in 2011 promulgated its Regulations on the Development and Management of microblogging, which stated that microblogging sites should ensure users were registered under their real names. Major microblogging sites like Sina Weibo, 163 and Sohu agreed to put real name systems into practice by 16 March 2012. Users who had not provided their real information would be barred from posting and transmitting messages thereafter. On 1 June 2017, the Chinese Cybersecurity Law took effect, requiring that everyone who uses Chinese websites to provide their phone number. China's state-run media claimed this would provide a "safe and real" Internet environment.

With respect to video games, Chinese regulations require real-name authentication ("real-name ID") since 1 January 2020. The regulations are set to become more stringent on 1 June 2021, requiring authentication with a government system instead of third-party services. The aim of the regulations is to curb excessive gaming by minors. People under 18 are restricted by these regulations to 90 minutes of gaming between 08:00 and 22:00 (180 minutes on holidays), and are also subject to restrictions on in-app payments based on their age.

Social networking sites

The enforcement of real-name systems has resulted in a series of conflicts known as nymwars, which raised issues regarding naming, cultural sensitivity, public and private identity, privacy, and the role of social media in modern discourse.

Google

Google previously introduced a real-name policy in July 2011, requiring users to use their real names on YouTube and Google+. User accounts that were identified as not following the policy were suspended. After wide-ranging criticisms from a number of high-profile commentators, Google dropped the real-name policy in July 2014 and ended restrictions on names.

Facebook

Facebook employs a real-name system. Its online Name Policy states: "Facebook is a community where people use their real identities. We require everyone to provide their real names, so you always know who you're connecting with. This helps keep our community safe." This strongly encourages users to provide real names when creating an account.

Facebook's first users were university students. According to Danah Boyd, a social media scholar, "people provided their name because they saw the site as an extension of campus life." Later users adopted the norms and practices of the early adopters. The use of real names contributed to the quality and quantity of information Facebook has about its users. Facebook became an identity service by encouraging users to share their lives, including their real names.

Emil Protalinski, technology journalist for The Next Web, states that some "Facebook users opt to use pseudonyms to hide from stalkers, abusive exes, and even governments that don't condone free speech." Pseudonyms allow these users to connect with colleagues, friends, and family without compromising their safety.

"People feel as though their privacy has been violated when their agency has been undermined or when information about a particular social context has been obscured in ways that subvert people's ability to make an informed decision about what to reveal." Some users may feel uncomfortable with displaying their real names and choose a fake name that appears real to others.

Twitter

Unlike Facebook, the Twitter social networking site does not require real-names for Twitter accounts. According to former CEO Dick Costolo Twitter does not care about real names. Whether the information comes from an account with a real name or one using a pseudonym does not matter. However, Twitter verifies accounts of prominent users such as celebrities and businesses in order to protect them against identity theft/fraud.

Quora

Previously, Quora required users to register with the complete form of their real names rather than an Internet pseudonym or other screen name. Although verification of names was not required, false names could be reported by the community.

On 19 April 2021, Quora eliminated the requirement that users use their real names and allowed users to use pseudonyms.

Yahoo Japan
From late 2020, Yahoo Japan has required users to register their Japanese mobile phone numbers when they open a new account. On 18 October 2022, Yahoo Japan announced on that only users who register their Japanese mobile phone numbers with its news website “Yahoo! News” will be able to post comments on news articles on the site.

References

Internet privacy
Human names